Raanujärvi is a medium-sized lake in the Tornionjoki main catchment area. It is located in the region Lapland in Finland.

See also
List of lakes in Finland

References

Lakes of Pello
Lakes of Ylitornio